Henrik Pontén (17 October 1965 – 15 May 2020) was a Swedish jurist active in the organization Svenska antipiratbyrån (Swedish Anti-Piracy Bureau), and was often seen representing the organization in the media. 

Pontén was born in Kalmar, and studied law at Stockholm University. He became well known in Swedish media during the Bahnhof raid and the raid against The Pirate Bay. 

As the most visible member of the anti-piracy organization, Pontén attracted unwanted attention from anonymous activists who opposed his work. In May 2009, a forged application with the Swedish Tax Agency was submitted to change his name to "Pirate Pontén". He died on 15 May 2020, from a brain injury in Lidingö, aged 54, following a bicycling accident on 1 January 2020.

References 

1965 births
2020 deaths
20th-century Swedish lawyers
People from Kalmar Municipality
21st-century Swedish lawyers